Pleomele is a former genus of flowering plants. All its species are now placed in the genus Dracaena. The Hawaiian name for plants in this genus is hala pepe, which translates to crushed or dwarfed Pandanus tectorius.

Former species 
Pleomele angustifolia (Medik.) N.E.Br. = Dracaena angustifolia
Pleomele atropurpurea (Roxb.) N.E.Br. = Dracaena elliptica
Pleomele aurea H.Mann - golden hala pepe (Kauai) = Dracaena aurea
Pleomele australasica Ridl. = Dracaena angustifolia
Pleomele auwahiensis H.St.John - Maui Nui hala pepe (Maui, Molokai) = Dracaena rockii
Pleomele elliptica (Thunb. & Dalm.) N.E.Br. = Dracaena elliptica
Pleomele fernaldii H.St.John - Lānai hala pepe (Lānai) = Dracaena fernaldii
Pleomele flexuosa (Blume) N.E.Br. = Dracaena angustifolia
Pleomele forbesii O.Deg.  - Waianae hala pepe (Oahu) = Dracaena forbesii
Pleomele fruticosa (K.Koch) N.E.Br. =Dracaena angustifolia
Pleomele gracilis (Baker) N.E.Br. = Dracaena elliptica
Pleomele halapepe H.St.John  - Oahu hala pepe (Oahu) = Dracaena halapepe
Pleomele hawaiiensis O.Deg. & I.Deg - Hawaii hala pepe (Island of Hawaii) = Dracaena konaensis

Uses

Medicinal
Native Hawaiians combined the bark and leaves of hala pepe with the root bark of uhaloa (Waltheria indica) and popolo (Solanum americanum), and a section of kō kea (Saccharum officinarum) to treat high fever and chills. Hala pepe bark, roots, and leaves were combined with ōhia ai (Syzygium malaccense) bark, uhaloa and popolo taproot bark, alaala wai nui pehu (Peperomia spp.) stems, noni (Morinda citrifolia) fruit, kō kea, niu (coconuts, Cocos nucifera), and pia (Tacca leontopetaloides) to treat lung disorders.

Non-medicinal
The soft wood of the trunk was carved by Native Hawaiians into kii. Hala pepe represented the goddess Kapo on the kuahu (altar) within a hālau hula (building which hula was taught or performed). It along with ieie (Freycinetia arborea), maile (Alyxia oliviformis), ōhia lehua (Metrosideros polymorpha) and palapalai (Microlepia strigosa) were the five essential plants at the hula altar.

References

Nolinoideae
Endemic flora of Hawaii
Historically recognized angiosperm genera
Taxa named by Richard Anthony Salisbury